The 84th Scripps National Spelling Bee was held from May 31 – June 2, 2011 at the Gaylord National Resort & Convention Center in Oxon Hill, Maryland near Washington, D.C. The champion was 14-year-old Sukanya Roy, who was the ninth Indian-American champion in the past thirteen competitions.

Competition
 275 spellers participated in this year's competition, representing the United States, American Samoa, the Bahamas, Canada, China,
 Two championship finalists from 2010 returned to participate in this Bee; Joanna Ye of Pennsylvania and Laura Newcombe of Ontario, Canada.
 This year was the seventh time the champion has come from Pennsylvania.
 This was the fourth year in a row than an Indian-American won the competition.
 During the last rounds of the final five spellers, 20 words were spelled correctly. This is the equivalent of 4 full competition rounds with no incorrectly spelled words.
 This year, the Bee also lasted approximately 3 full hours, 1.5 hours more than the originally scheduled length.
 This was the first year that the Bee was held outside the city limits of Washington, D.C., moving from the Grand Hyatt Washington where it had been held for 15 years, to the Gaylord National Resort & Convention Center.

Top finishers

 Sukanya Roy, of South Abington Township, Lackawanna County, Pennsylvania, representing the Times Leader of Wilkes-Barre, Pennsylvania, won the competition by spelling cymotrichous.
 Laura Newcombe, of Toronto, Ontario, was the runner-up. She was eliminated by the word sorites as "psorites".
 Joanna Ye, of Carlisle, Pennsylvania, and Arvind Mahankali, of Forest Hills, New York, tied for third place. Ye was eliminated by the word galoubet as "galubey", while Mahankali misspelled jugendstil as "uguntschtiel". Mahankali made a joke when he got "Jugendstil" as his word, asking for the word to be repeated, and he said "You could steal?" as the word he got, jugendstil, was very similar to that phrase.
 Dakota Jones, of Las Vegas, Nevada, placed fifth; he was eliminated by the word zanja, spelling it as "zangha".
 Veronica Penny, of Rockland, Ontario, Dhivya Senthil Murugan, of Denver, Colorado, Sriram Hathwar, of Painted Post, New York, and Mashad Arora of Brownsville, Texas, tied for sixth place.
 Lily Jordan, of Cape Elizabeth, Maine, Nabeel Rahman, of Buffalo, New York, and Prakash Mishra, of Waxhaw, North Carolina, tied for tenth place.
 Samuel Estep, of Berryville, Virginia, placed thirteenth.

Word list championship round

References

External links
 Scripps National Spelling Bee official website

Scripps National Spelling Bee competitions
Scripps National Spelling Bee
2010s American television specials
Scripps National Spelling Bee
Scripps National Spelling Bee
Oxon Hill, Maryland
Scripps National Spelling Bee
Scripps National Spelling Bee